Ansis Dāle (born 14 September 1967) is a Latvian windsurfer. He competed at the 1992 Summer Olympics and the 1996 Summer Olympics.

References

External links
 
 

1967 births
Living people
Latvian male sailors (sport)
Latvian windsurfers
Olympic sailors of Latvia
Sailors at the 1992 Summer Olympics – Lechner A-390
Sailors at the 1996 Summer Olympics – Mistral One Design
Sportspeople from Riga